Todd Williamson (born January 24, 1964 in Cullman, Alabama) is an American artist specializing in contemporary abstract expressionism.

Life

Development and artistic influence 
Todd Williamson was born and raised in Cullman, Alabama. In 1984 he began his artistic career with art and music study at Belmont University in Nashville, Tennessee. Come 1986, Williamson was recruited to the University of Alabama at Birmingham to work with their theatre for one year. He then returned to the Belmont University and concluded his study program with a BA in 1988. In the following year, Williamson moved to California and studied at California State University, and  UCLA, working towards his MA. Since 2004, Williamson works as a professional artist in Los Angeles.
Besides being stimulated by the works of Mark Rothko, Ellsworth Kelly, Barnett Newman and Helen Frankenthaler, his works include elements of classical modern art, with references to the Chiaroscuro technique, and to the California Light and Space movement of the 1960s and 70's. Williamson has been deeply influenced by his early musical studies. His works attempt to show the connection between art and the expression of music, the objective being to give the viewer an all-embracing artwork ("Gesamtkunstwerk") of "musical art" or "visual music".

Style and techniques 
Williamson's paintings are structured color compositions, effected by the abstract expressionism, and an enhancement of the Color field painting. While the color field painting is marked by large-scale, homogeneously filled fields, Williamson interprets this style in a new manner: His works are mostly composed of multilayered color grids which differentiate themselves symmetrically of each other or go over into each other. He does this by using a variety in thickness of paint as well as a series of lines and grids which create a framework to control the chaos and emotion of the painted color-fields, creating an ethereal and multi-layered surface. The borders which are typical for the color field painting become blurred; to its place steps the impression of the complete works which connects the structure of the underground with the play of the colors.
Williamson dealt first with figurative art, and has developed mono-chromatic works since about 1990. His mono-chromatic works are not necessarily limited to the dominance of only one color. However, many of his latest works are characterized by parallel lines which move in both horizontal, and vertical direction. He often uses contrasts in the form of bright and dark dividing lines which split his work by adding and leaving out light. For example, at the prelude and the end of a partiture. Williamson tries in this manner to create a bridge from expressionist painting to musical expressionism.

Exhibitions 
Todd Williamson's works have been shown in over 60 exhibitions worldwide. His work is in numerous collections around the world and was included in the permanent collection of the Pio Monte della Misericordia in 2015 where it hung next to Caravaggio's Seven Works of Mercy for a period of time. Besides single exhibitions e.g. in Milan, Montreal, Paris, Rome and Venice, joined exhibitions were put in Abu Dhabi, Berlin, Shanghai and Peking together with artists like Ed Ruscha, Jenny Holzer, Chuck Close and Robert Ryman.
Williamson has also done a number of public art works including the Sun America Building in Century City, the California Bar Association Los Angeles, the Nashville International Airport as well as the Aria Hotel and Casino in Las Vegas.
 2020: Georges Bergès Gallery, New York
 2020: art Karlsruhe, Karlsruhe
 2020: BEGE Galerien, Ulm
 2019 Biennale di Venezia, Venice
 2019: MAC Museum Art & Cars, Singen (Hohentwiel)
 2019: Art Gallery Wiesbaden
 2018: NUMU New Museum Los Gatos, Los Gatos
 2017: Ex Fabbrica Lucchesi, Prato
 2016 Palm Springs Art Museum – Saguaro Artist Council Exhibition, Palm Springs
 2015 Pio Monte della Misericordia – "Contemporary Response to Caravaggio" (Curator: Cynthia Penna, Art 1307), Naples
 2015 Gallery Premium Modern Art, Heilbronn
 2014 Nicole Longnecker Gallery – "Inside the Lines", Houston
 2014 Kevin Barry Fine Art – "Laddie John Dill & Todd Williamson", Santa Monica
 2013 Fellini Gallery, Berlin
 2013 Wade Wilson Art – "Illusion of the Precise" (with Robert Ryman), Houston
 2012 P.A.N. Museum – "Todd Williamson a PAN!" (Curator: Cynthia Penna, Art 1307), Naples
 2011 George Billis Gallery – "Thoughts from a Mind Like Mine", Los Angeles
 2010 Ippodo Gotenyama Gallery, Tokyo

Works in public collections (selection) 
 Museo Pio Monte della Misericordia, Napels
 MAUI Museum, Teano
 Contemporary Art Museum (CAM), Naples
 The Ritz-Carlton, Los Angeles
 SunAmerica Center, Century City, Los Angeles

Honors and awards 
 2019 Pollock-Krasner Foundation - Pollock Prize for Creativity, New York
 2015 Bluduemila Associazione Sport & Arte – Best Foreign Artist, Naples, Italy
 2010 Pollock-Krasner Foundation – Award Grant, New York
 2010 ART 1307 Istituzione Culturale – Artistic Merit Award, Naples, Italy
 2010 Artslant International – Abstract Showcase Award Winner
 2007 Curators Choice Award "Spectrum" – micromuseum, New York

Bibliography 
 2015 Roberta Andolfo: How far can music and painting touch each other? In: ilpickwick dated December 1, 2015
 2015 Nicolas Marlin and Sara Lee Burd: Todd Williamson Creates Zone of Tranquility at the Rymer, in: The Huffington Post dated April 20th, 2015
 2015 Il Mattino: Napoli: To See the Music, To Listen to Color, November 26, 2015
 2015 Todd Williamson, Polifonia di un Paesaggio: a Villa di Donato la pittura si ascolta, in: RACNA-Magazine dated November 21st, 2015
 2014 Nicolas Marlin and Cynthia Penna: Pas de Deux, in: The Huffington Post dated November 10th. 2014
 2012 Emanuele Leone Emblema: Williamson: Napoli è la luce, in: Il Denaro dated April 21st, 2012

External links 

 Website of Todd Williamson
 Interview 2016
 Online-Exhibition The Disillusionment of Truth
 Exhibition Polifonia di un Paesaggio, Napels

References 

1964 births
20th-century American painters
American male painters
21st-century American painters
American contemporary painters
Living people
Abstract expressionist artists
Artists from California
20th-century American male artists